Papua New Guinea Prime Minister's XIII, or sometimes informally referred to as the PNG PM's XIII, is the name of a representative rugby league team, comprising Papua New Guinean players from the Papua New Guinea National Rugby League, PNG Hunters and other overseas clubs. The team is selected to play an annual fixture against Australian Prime Minister's XIII in Papua New Guinea in the final weeks of the rugby league season.

History
The PNG Prime Minister's XIII first played against their Australian counterparts in 2005 at Lloyd Robson Oval in the Papua New Guinean capital, Port Moresby. The team was coached in that match by former national team head coach Bob Bennett. The side has also been coached by former Papua New Guinean internationals Adrian Lam and Stanley Gene and is currently coached by Michael Marum, who played for the team in 2005.

Originally played in Port Moresby, in recent years the games have been held in various locations around Papua New Guinea, including Lae and Kokopo. Unlike regular international matches, each team is allowed a five-man bench and given unlimited interchanges throughout the match.

Originally, the team was made up of players predominantly from the local Papua New Guinea National Rugby League competition. In recent years, players from the National Rugby League, Intrust Super Cup and English Championship have also been selected.

The match is also used to promote rugby league, as well as humanitarian causes such as HIV and AIDS awareness, among the Papua New Guinean community.

The PNG PM's XIII has never won a match against Australia since the annual fixture commenced, but managed a 24–24 draw in 2007, after trailing 20–0 at half time. In 2019, the PNG PM's XIII did not play the Australian side, who instead faced the Fiji Prime Minister's XIII.

Results

2005

2006

2007

2008

2009

2010

2011

2012

2013

2014

2015

2016

2017

2018

2022

Players

Captains
Keith Peters (2006–2007, 2009)
Stanley Gene (2008)
Paul Aiton (2010–2011)
Charlie Wabo (2013)
Israel Eliab (2014)
Albert Patak (2015)
Ase Boas (2016)
Charlie Simon (2017)
David Mead (2018)

Coaches
Bob Bennett (2005)
Adrian Lam (2006–2009, 2011–2013)
Stanley Gene (2010)
Michael Marum (2014, 2016, 2018)
Mal Meninga (2014)
Stanley Tepend (2015, 2017, 2022)

Records

Individual
 Most games
 8 Rodney Pora (2005–2012)
 7 Paul Aiton (2006–2008, 2010–2011, 2013)
 7 Jessie Joe Nandye (2005, 2007–2011, 2013)
 7 Charlie Wabo (2005, 2007–2008, 2010–2013)
 6 Larsen Marabe (2008–2013)
 Most tries
 3 Nickson Kolo
 3 Jessie Joe Nandye
 3 Menzie Yere
 Most points
 16 Glen Nami
 12 Nickson Kolo
 12 Jessie Joe Nandye
 12 Menzie Yere
 Most tries in a match
 2 Tom O'Reilly (2006)
 2 Stanley Gene (2008)
 2 Menzie Yere (2008)
 2 Nickson Kolo (2010)
 2 Thompson Teteh (2014)
 Most points in a match
 10 Rhyse Martin (2018)

See also

Papua New Guinea national rugby league team

References

Papua New Guinean rugby league teams
P
National rugby league teams
Rugby clubs established in 2005
2005 establishments in Papua New Guinea